The Award for Heroism is an award of the United States Department of State.  It is presented to employees of State, USAID and Marine guards assigned to diplomatic and consular facilities in recognition of acts of courage or outstanding performance under unusually difficult or dangerous circumstances, whether or not in connection with the performance of assigned duties.

The award consists of a silver medal set and a certificate signed by an assistant secretary, an official of equivalent rank or the Chief of Mission.  Due to the location and dangerous nature of their work, the majority of the recipients have been Foreign Service Special Agents of the Diplomatic Security Service.

The Award for Heroism is a replacement for the former Award for Valor.  The basic difference between the two medals is that the Valor Award was issued in 10K gold whereas the Heroism Award is issued in sterling silver.  The ribbon reflects this; the designs are almost identical, but the color scheme indicates the precious metal issued with the respective awards.

Criteria

The following criteria are applicable to granting an Award for Heroism:

 Sustained superior performance while under threat of physical attack or harassment; or
 An individual act of courage or exceptional performance at the risk of personal safety.

Nominating and approval procedures

Nominations for State and USAID employees are submitted on Form JF-66, Nomination for Award, through supervisory channels to the Joint Country Awards Committee for review and recommendation to the Chief of Mission for final action.

Nominations initiated in Washington are submitted to the appropriate area awards committee for final action. For USAID, nominations initiated in Washington are reviewed by the USAID bureau/office with final approval by the appropriate assistant administrator or office head.

Military use

Upon authorization, members of the U.S. military may wear the medal and ribbon in the appropriate order of precedence as a U.S. non-military personal decoration.

Recipients

 Matt Sherman, Foreign Service Officer, former Senior Civilian Representative in Afghanistan for assisting in the rescue of wounded American soldiers following an ambush in the Tangi Valley, Wardak Province, 2009.
 Lynne Tracy, Foreign Service Officer, former Consul General of the U.S. Consulate General in Peshawar, Pakistan, 2007–2009, for service in Pakistan weathering numerous threats and a failed assassination attempt
 Tomas A. Perez, Diplomatic Courier, 2009, for saving lives and ensuring the integrity of diplomatic cargo during an airplane crash
 Paul Peterson, Special Agent, Diplomatic Security Service, RSO, Nairobi, 1998, for Perimeter Protection / search and rescue of injured American employees in the Al Qaeda bombing of the US Embassy, Nairobi, Kenya
Bob Simon, Special Agent, Diplomatic Security Service, ARSO, Nairobi, 1998,  for Perimeter Protection / search and rescue of injured American employees in the Al Qaeda bombing of the US Embassy, Nairobi, Kenya
 John V. Kane, Special Agent, Diplomatic Security Service, ARSO, Nairobi, 1998,  for Perimeter Protection / search and rescue of injured American employees in the Al Qaeda bombing of the US Embassy, Nairobi, Kenya
 Worley (Lee) Reed, Special Agent / Security Engineering Officer, Diplomatic Security Service, OIC/ESC, Nairobi, 1998, for Leading search and rescue of injured American employees in the Al Qaeda bombing of the US Embassy, Nairobi, Kenya
 Joyce Ann Reed, Information Management Assistant, Communications Office, Nairobi, 1998, for search and rescue / medical evacuation of injured American employees in the Al Qaeda bombing of the US Embassy, Nairobi, Kenya (She is spouse of Worley (Lee) Reed; they are first married couple to win the award for the same incident)
 Stephen J. Nolan, Foreign Service Officer, U.S. Ambassador to Botswana
 Thomas Eckert, Special Agent, Diplomatic Security Service, Burma, 2009, for the rescue of an American family during a flood
 Bryan Bachman, Special Agent, Diplomatic Security Service, Iraq, 2008, for courageous efforts to protect the Basrah Regional Embassy Office from attack
 Daniel Wilhelm, Special Agent, Diplomatic Security Service, Iraq, 2008, for courageous efforts to protect the Basrah Regional Embassy Office from attack
 John L. Dunlop, Foreign Service Officer, USAID, 
First Award: Nairobi, 1998,  search and rescue of injured American employees in the Al Qaeda bombing of the US Embassy, Nairobi, Kenya 
Second Award: Baghdad, 2009, response to the Dora Market suicide bombing of 5/21/2009 
 Michael Poehlitz, Special Agent, Diplomatic Security Service, Nicaragua, 2007, for saving an American citizen from a violent and angry mob
 Christopher Belmonti, Special Agent, Diplomatic Security Service, Haiti, 2004, for risking his life to save American citizens during an evacuation
 Raymond Kyliavas, Special Agent, Diplomatic Security Service, Haiti, 2004, for risking his life to save American citizens during an evacuation
 Alston Richardson, Special Agent, Diplomatic Security Service, Haiti, 2004, for risking his life to save American citizens during an evacuation
 Brian C. Palmatier, Special Agent, assisted an injured U.S. Marine and then immediately rendered first aid preventing the critically injured Marine from going into shock and stabilized his condition until other first responders arrived. Attending surgeons credited SA Palmatier with the Marine’s survival.
 Jason Crosby, Special Agent, after the U.S. Embassy in Baghdad, Iraq was hit by a rocket, Crosby responded and administered critical medical aid to three severely injured staff and set up an evacuation site. Crosby also led a motorcade out of a sniper ambush and evacuated a wounded colleague.
 George Jacobson, mission coordinator at the Embassy of the United States, Saigon for killing a Vietcong during the Tet offensive attack on US Embassy

See also 
 Awards of the United States Department of State
 Awards and decorations of the United States government
 United States Department of State
 U.S. Foreign Service

References

External links
Full List of Diplomatic Security Service Special Agents who have received the Award for Heroism on the Diplomatic Security Wiki

Awards and decorations of the United States Department of State
United States Department of State